"It's Crazy for You" (stylized as "It's crazy for you") is a song by Japanese singer-songwriter Rina Aiuchi. It was released on 31 May 2000 through Giza Studio, as the second single from her debut studio album Be Happy. The song reached number sixteen in Japan and has sold over 56,070 copies nationwide.

Covers
"It's Crazy for You" was covered by Aika Ohno, the writer of the song for her debut studio album Shadows of Dreams (2002), renamed as "I'm Crazy for You". The album peaked at number fifteen in Japan.

Track listing

Charts

Certification and sales

|-
! scope="row"| Japan (RIAJ)
| 
| 56,070
|-
|}

Release history

References

2000 singles
2000 songs
J-pop songs
Songs written by Aika Ohno
Song recordings produced by Daiko Nagato
Songs written by Rina Aiuchi